Lackey is an unincorporated community in Monroe County, Mississippi.

According to the United States Geological Survey, a variant name is Noah.

References

Unincorporated communities in Monroe County, Mississippi
Unincorporated communities in Mississippi